The Minocqua-Hazelhurst-Lake Tomahawk Elementary School is an elementary school district serving 580 children in grades K-8 living in the towns of Minocqua, Hazelhurst and Lake Tomahawk. The MHLT School District encompasses  in Oneida County and is considered part of “The Northwoods” of North Central Wisconsin. MHLT is one of four elementary districts that feed into Lakeland Union High School. Each district is administered by its own Board of Education.

The MHLT School district offers a comprehensive program of studies for students including support and enrichment services for any level of student need. It also offers a charter school, Woodland Progressive School For 21st Century Citizens. A second charter school, Creative Minds, is expected to open in September.  The staff includes 56 teachers and support staff members, 2 administrators, 5 supervisors, 4 instructional aides, 3 custodians, and 3 food service workers.  The district is administered by a five-member board.  According to the district, student achievement results are consistently above state and national averages with students scoring in the top 25% for students nationwide in Reading, Language, Arts, Math, Science and Social Studies. While achievement scores exceed the state average, per pupil costs are below state average and are the lowest in the Lakeland area. A wide range of extra curricular and after school activities is offered by the district, including summer school.

References

Public elementary schools in Wisconsin
Schools in Oneida County, Wisconsin
Charter schools in Wisconsin